The Apostolic Vicariate of Beirut (Latin: Vicariatus Apostolicus Berytensis) is a Latin Church ecclesiastical jurisdiction or apostolic vicariate of the Catholic Church in Lebanon, where Eastern Catholics are far more numerous. In 2010, there were 15,000 baptized. Its current bishop is Cesar Essayan.
 
Its cathedral episcopal see is the St. Louis Cathedral, Beirut in the national capital city Beirut, while the former Crusader Cathedral of Tyre is in ruins.

Antecedents 
The Catholic presence in Lebanon of the Latin Church began with the Crusades in the late of eleventh century and ends with the final defeat of the Crusaders and the disappearance of the Crusader principalities in the Levant after the middle of the thirteenth century. In this period, in the lands corresponding to the current Lebanon were established several Latin ecclesiasticals, which most of the time they were supplanting ancient bishoprics of the early days of Christianity: the Archdiocese of Tyre from which depended the suffragan dioceses of Latin Catholic Bishop of Acre, Caesarea Philippi, Sidon and Berytus (modern Beirut), while from the Latin Patriarch of Antioch depended the suffragan dioceses of Byblos, Tripoli and Antarado. These dioceses disappeared with the end of the Crusader period and remain today mostly as the venue owners.

The Latin continued presence in the country with the Friars Minor, who arrived as early as the thirteenth century, and then with missionaries of other religious orders, such as the Capuchin Friars, the Carmelites, the Vincentians and the Jesuits, who arrived in the seventeenth century. For the faithful of the Latin Rite of Lebanon was not instituted any ecclesiastical district until the end of the French mandate at the end of World War II: the Apostolic Delegate (papal diplomatic envoy) of Syria held the functions of the bishop of the Latin Catholics of Lebanon.

History 
The apostolic vicariate was erected on 4 June 1953 with the Papal bull Solent caeli of Pope Pius XII, with territory that was taken from the Syrian Apostolic Vicariate of Aleppo. The apostolic vicar is a member of the Conference of the Latin Bishops of the Arab Regions.

It enjoyed a papal visit from Benedict XVI in September 2012.

Organisation 
The apostolic vicariate extends its jurisdiction over all Catholic faithful of the Latin Rite in Lebanon. It is exempt, i.e. directly subject to the Holy See, not part if any ecclesiastical province.

Its territory is divided into only eighth Latin parishes.

Episcopal ordinaries
(all Roman Rite)
 Eustace John Smith, O.F.M., Titular Bishop of Apamea Cibotus (8 December 1955 – 1973 Resignation) 
 Paul Bassim, O.C.D., Titular Bishop of Laodicea ad Libanum (8 September 1974 – 30 July 1999 Retired) 
 Paul Dahdah, O.C.D., Titular Archbishop of Aræ in Numidia (30 July 1999 – 2 August 2016)
 Cesar Essayan, O.F.M.Conv. (2 August 2016 – present)

See also 
 Latin Patriarchate of Jerusalem
 Latin Church in the Middle East
 List of Catholic dioceses in Lebanon

Eastern Catholic
 Armenian Catholic Archeparchy of Beirut (Metropolitanate)
 Melkite Greek Catholic Archeparchy of Beirut and Byblos (Metropolitanate)
 Maronite Catholic Archeparchy of Beirut (non-metropolitan)
 Chaldean Catholic Eparchy of Beirut
 Syrian Catholic Eparchy of Beirut (Patriarch of Antioch's proper diocese)

References

Sources and external links
 GCatholic, with incumbent biography links
 

Catholicism in Beirut
Apostolic vicariates
Roman Catholic dioceses in Asia
Catholic Church in Lebanon
Organisations based in Beirut
1953 establishments in Asia